The Cape Cod or  Cape Codder (also known as vodka cranberry and 
The Hammer) is a type of cocktail consisting of vodka and cranberry juice. Some recipes also call for squeezing a lime wedge over the glass and dropping it into the drink. The name refers to Cape Cod, Massachusetts, a peninsula and popular tourist destination located in the eastern United States which is famous for growing cranberries.

Ingredients
A Cape Cod is made with vodka and cranberry juice, and may be garnished with a lime wedge. Proportions vary, with sources giving a recommended vodka-to-juice ratio of 1/4, 1/3.7, 1/2 and 1/1.5, while other sources do not recommend precise proportions. Some sources recommend lime juice instead of a lime wedge garnish.

Related drinks
The Cape Codder is related to a number of other cocktails such as the Sea Breeze (which adds grapefruit juice), the Bay Breeze (which adds pineapple juice), the Madras (which adds orange juice), the Woo Woo (which adds peach schnapps), Sex on the Beach (which adds orange juice and peach schnapps), the Cosmopolitan, which adds triple sec and lime juice, and Rose Kennedy Cocktail which includes club soda. The Grape Codder, in addition to vodka and cranberry juice, also has lime juice and grape juice. A Cape Codder with ginger ale is a transfusion. A Cape Codder with lemon-lime soda is called a JC Concord. A Cape Codder with lychee liqueur is a red lotus cocktail. A Cape Codder with raspberry liqueur is a purple haze.

Background
This drink was conceived in 1945 by the Ocean Spray cranberry grower's cooperative under the name "Red Devil" in Cape Cod, Massachusetts. The "Cape Codder" name dates from the early 1960s.

See also
 List of cocktails

References

External links

Discussion of the Cape Codder at Esquire Magazine

Cocktails with vodka
Cocktails with cranberry juice